Oppheimsvatnet is a lake in the municipality of Voss in Vestland county, Norway. The European route E16 highway runs along the northern side of the lake, right past Oppheim Church which sits in the small village of Oppheim, after which the lake is named. The village of Vasstrondi lies on the southern shore.

See also
List of lakes in Norway

References

Voss
Lakes of Vestland